Monumental is the name of a station in the Barcelona Metro network. It takes its name from the former La Monumental bullring located in Eixample Dret, the northern part of the central Barcelona district of Eixample. It's served by L2 (purple line), and opened in 1995, along with the other stations of the first section of the line to be built (from Sant Antoni to Sagrada Família). It's situated under Carrer de la Marina between Consell de Cent and Diputació, and can be accessed from both sidewalks of Marina.

Services

See also
List of Barcelona Metro stations

External links

Monumental at Trenscat.com

Railway stations in Spain opened in 1995
Transport in Eixample
Barcelona Metro line 2 stations